Hyper Force is a side-scrolling action-adventure platform video game developed by Visual Impact Productions and published by Songbird Productions exclusively for the Atari Jaguar on April 10, 2000.

The players take control of a lone soldier in the year 2099, where a megacorporation that has destroyed multiple planets plans to start a war against Earth if they are not stopped. Originally announced in 1994, Hyper Force was showcased in E3 1995 but it was not released until 2000, a year after the system was declared as an open platform by Hasbro Interactive in 1999.

Hyper Force received generally positive reviews from critics since its release, with praise towards the graphics, controls and gameplay, while the music, sound effects and technical shortcomings of the game were regarded as negative points.

Gameplay 

Hyper Force is a 2D, side-scrolling, action-adventure platform game which takes places on the fictional planet Terran where the player controls a lone soldier from the Interstellar Special Forces across four areas, each having a set of six levels to travel through on a mission to destroy the megacorporation Trans Con, who plans to launch an attack against Earth. Progress is manually kept by the cartridge's EEPROM by saving on either of the three slots available by pausing the game at any time and pressing Option on the controller and they are allowed to resume their last game by pressing Option at the title screen and choosing either saved slot to continue. The game cartridge also keeps high-scores and settings made by the player as well.

Throughout the course of the game, the player fights against a variety of enemies and robots, who randomly drop power-ups, health, tech items that increase the score and money to pick up after being destroyed, with the later being used at the Interstellar Special Forces shop after finishing a level to buy new weapons and their respective upgrades, health recharge and lives, though items are also scattered in the level to pick up as well. After finishing six levels, a story cutscene is shown to progress the story. In various levels there hidden locations that contains items and other important elements introduced later in the game. Introduced in the first level are ropes that the player can hang on and traverse through the level while also shoot enemies when hanging, but players can also hang off from them by pressing down or jump from them by pressing both the jump and the shoot buttons at the same time.

Also scattered through the level are obstacles such as spikes and traps, with more obstacles such as destructible blocks and colored barriers that obstruct the pathway of the player, with the later becoming more important when other colored barriers are introduced and these can be opened by finding their respective colored switch. When shooting at the enemies on the ground, players can also aim their shots by crouching or looking up. Players can also collide with enemies but they do not receive points by doing so and if they die, they are sent back to the start of the level but item pick ups are not respawned and the game is over once all lives are lost. Colliding with the metallic orbs scattered around the level that obstruct the path too many times will result in the activation of a 100-second destruction timer, which kills the player instantly if they do not quickly find the exit from the level.

Plot 
In the year 2099 before the start of a new century, mankind has managed to expand into the stars through development of devices that allows interstellar travel possible and at a short time, with technological breakthroughs creating new levels of medical care and automation but megacorporations have unlimited desires to expand their operations in outer space, with Trans Con being the most ruthless by decimating multiple planets and harnessing resources to break the restrains of the Terran High Command. Not wanting to lose corporative support, politicians chose to ignore the situation, which became more delicated and as a result they turn to the Interstellar Special Forces to eradicate Trans Con and their empire, by destroying their multiple bases of operations and affiliated cops, guardians and soldiers without involvement of the population by sending a lone soldier from the special forces, who faces the possibility of being disowned by the government if he fails in completing the task.

When the lone soldier destroys Trans Con's mining bases and crosses through Varmox City, he receives a message from ISF that the megacorporation has created a supersoldier after arriving at their rocket garden fortress and by the time he arrives at their secret laboratories, receives another message that Trans Con is preparing to start a clone war against Earth unless he stops their scientists in the area. Although the lone soldier succeeds in stopping the scientists on the laboratories, one of the supersoldiers named the Trans Con Warrior manages to escape. After destroying it, the soldier activates a self-destruct button that annihilates Trans Con alongside their empire with the lone soldier escaping from their homeworld, returning to Earth and he is honored for his work.

Development and release 
Hyper Force was first previewed in 1994 on French magazine CD Consoles, featuring a different graphical artstyle from the final release. Their preview article also mentioned Visual Impact working on a second project for the Jaguar, which was inspired by Doom. It was primarily developed in Belgium. Internal testing reports in regards to the game from Atari Corporation indicated that many elements of the game were criticized. The game was showcased in a playable state at E3 1995, where it was slated to be published by Computer West, who published both Cannon Fodder and  Pinball Fantasies for the Jaguar in 1995 respectively but Hyper Force went unreleased due to the discontinuation of the Jaguar for not performing well both commercially and critically, until Songbird Productions picked the rights and licensed the game from Visual Impact to release it, however, since the developer did not provided the source code of the game, it was released as it was received by the publisher. The game was released almost a year after the system was declared as an open platform by Hasbro Interactive in 1999.

Reception 

Hyper Force received generally positive reviews since its release. Eric Mylonas of GameFan gave a positive outlook to the game and compared it with Contra, praising the graphics and difficulty while criticizing the color choices in the game and limited sprite animations, remarking that "What here is good but a little more animation would have been nice".

David Sherwin of The Atari Times gave positive remarks to the gameplay, controls and graphics but criticized the music, sound effects, the process of saving the game and bugs in regards to restoring the game. He summarized by saying "Hyper Force doesn't bring very many new things to modern console gaming and, with its somewhat dated side-scrolling blaster action and limited graphic environments, is definitely showing its age. That being said, Hyper Force is a polished and professional effort that will provide hours of entertainment for most Jaguar gamers".

References

External links 

 
 Hyper Force at AtariAge
 Hyper Force at GameFAQs
 Hyper Force at MobyGames

2000 video games
Action-adventure games
Atari games
Atari Jaguar games
Atari Jaguar-only games
Platform games
Single-player video games
Songbird Productions games
Video games developed in Belgium
Video games set in the 2090s
Video games set in the future
Video games set on fictional planets